Gertrude E. Polcar (October 10, 1916 – September 23, 1988) was a former member of the Ohio House of Representatives.  Polcar received her J.D. degree from the University of Chicago Law School.  After serving in the Ohio House of Representatives, she was elected to the Parma Municipal Court and served there until she became ill with cancer and resigned her seat a few months before her death.

References

External links
Gertrude E. Polcar - Ohio Statehouse Ladies' Gallery

1916 births
Republican Party members of the Ohio House of Representatives
People from Parma, Ohio
Women state legislators in Ohio
1988 deaths
20th-century American politicians
20th-century American women politicians